Sandven is a surname. Notable people with the surname include:

Johannes Sandven (1909–2000), Norwegian educator
Liv Sandven (born 1946), Norwegian politician

Norwegian-language surnames